Hainan College of Foreign Studies (HNCFS) is a tertiary institution in Wenchang, Hainan, China.

 it has about 300 employees, including 20 non-Chinese teachers, and 5,000 students. The institution was established in 1947 and began admitting non-Chinese students in 2004.

References

External links
 Hainan College of Foreign Studies
 Hainan College of Foreign Studies 

Universities and colleges in Hainan
1947 establishments in China